Eugenia capensis, the dune myrtle, is a species of plant in the family Myrtaceae, which is native to East and southern Africa.

Subspecies
The subspecies are:
 E. capensis subsp. albanensis (Sond.) F.White
 E. capensis subsp. capensis
 E. capensis subsp. gueinzii (Sond.) F.White
 E. capensis subsp. natalitia (Sond.) F.White
 E. capensis subsp. nyassensis (Engl.) F.White
 E. capensis subsp. simii (Dummer) F.White
 E. capensis subsp. zeyheri (Harv.) F.White

References

Further reading

Flora of South Africa
capensis
Geoxyles
Taxonomy articles created by Polbot
Taxobox binomials not recognized by IUCN